Román Rodríguez (born March 30, 1966, in San Mateo, Venezuela) is a scout for the Los Angeles Angels.

Career
Rodríguez was signed as a non-drafted free agent in 1988 by the Pittsburgh Pirates and spent eight years in their minor league system.
Upon concluding his playing career, Rodríguez was hired by the Kansas City Royals from 1997 until 2000 as bullpen catcher. In 2001, he took a job in the same role with the Boston Red Sox.  In 2002, he became a part of the New York Yankees staff, as a bullpen catcher and assisting with the charting of pitches during games. After the 2016 season, Rodríguez joined the Los Angeles Angels as a scout.

Personal life
Rodríguez resides in Bradenton, Florida with his wife Carminia, whom he married on Valentine's Day in 2004, and their daughter, Adriana.

External links

References

1966 births
Living people
Gulf Coast Pirates players
Princeton Pirates players
Salem Buccaneers players
Augusta Pirates players
Carolina Mudcats players
Stockton Ports players
Lake Elsinore Storm players
San Bernardino Spirit players
Los Angeles Angels scouts
Lynchburg Hillcats players
Major League Baseball bullpen catchers